Tetracha fulgida, common name bright metallic tiger beetle, is a species of beetles of the family Carabidae.

Description
The basic color is metallic red with green margins. The side edges of the elytra along the posterior part are pale yellow. Adults are almost flightless, but possess functional wings. They are nocturnal and ground-dwelling.

Distribution
This species occurs in Ecuador, Colombia, Argentina, Bolivia, Brazil, Peru and Paraguay.

References

Cicindelidae
Beetles of South America
Arthropods of Colombia
Beetles described in 1834